Ayase may refer to:

Places
Ayase, Kanagawa, Japan
Ayase, an area in Adachi, Tokyo, Japan
Ayase Station, train station in Adachi, Tokyo

People
Haruka Ayase (born 1985), Japanese actress
 (born 2000), Japanese musical artist

Characters
Megumi Ayase, a character from Creamy Mami, the Magic Angel
Yue Ayase, a character from Negima!?
Yukiya Ayase, a Yaoi uke character from No Money
Ayase Ayatsuji, a character from Chivalry of a Failed Knight
Ayase Aragaki, a character from Oreimo
Eli Ayase, a character from Love Live!
Chihaya Ayase, the main character from Chihayafuru
Hanabi Ayase, a character from Age 12
Ayase Shinomiya, a character from Guilty Crown

Japanese-language surnames